The 2017 Aegon Manchester Trophy is a professional tennis tournament played on outdoor grass courts. It is the first edition of the women's tournament and part of the 2017 ITF Women's Circuit, offering a total of $100,000 in prize money. It takes place in Manchester, United Kingdom, from 12–18 June 2017.

Point distribution

Singles main draw entrants

Seeds 

 1 Rankings as of 29 May 2017

Other entrants 
The following players received wildcards into the singles main draw:
  Emily Appleton
  Katie Boulter
  Katie Swan

The following player received entry into the singles main draw by a protected ranking:
  Alla Kudryavtseva

The following players received entry from the qualifying draw:
  Vivian Heisen
  Samantha Murray
  Maria Sanchez
  Valeria Savinykh

The following player received entry as a lucky loser:
  Emily Webley-Smith

Champions

Singles

 Zarina Diyas def.  Aleksandra Krunić, 6–4, 6–4

Doubles

 Magdalena Fręch /  An-Sophie Mestach def.  Chang Kai-chen /  Marina Erakovic, 6–4, 7–6(7–5)

External links 
 2017 Aegon Manchester Trophy at ITFtennis.com
 Official website

2017 in British sport
2017 ITF Women's Circuit
June 2017 sports events in the United Kingdom
2017
2017 in English tennis